DNA Motor (former Daelim Motor Company, Ltd) is a South Korean motorcycle, motorscooter and ATV manufacturer. It produces over 300,000 vehicles a year since production started in 1963. Daelim's products are popular in Germany, Spain, United Kingdom, Australia, France, Italy, Israel, Rwanda, Yemen and Sudan.

History
Founded in 1962 as a division of the DL Industries, Daelim began producing Japanese Honda motorcycle designs under license for the South Korean market in Seoul, South Korea in 1963. In 1976, they established their own research and development center in Hamamatsu, Japan, and the next year, they began mass production of their own designs.

In 2018, the motorcycle division was separated and became a Daelim Motorcycle.

In 2021, the South Korean Daelim Motorcycles changed their name to the  DNA Motors, although the export brand in the U.K. remains unchanged.

Models

Motorcycles
VJF125 Roadsport R 125
VJF250 Roadsport
VJ 125 Roadwin E 2004-2007/Roadwin FI 2008 124cc- still trading 
VL 125 Daystar 125
VC 125 Advance
VS 
VT
Scooters
S3 125 FI/250 Advance
S2 125/250
S1 125
Besbi 125
Delfino 125
B-Bone 125
S-Five 50
E-Five 50
A-Four 50
Cordi 50
NS 125
Business
Citi 100 (1987 - 2004)
Citi Plus (1997 - 2003)
Citi Ace 110 (2002 - 2008)
City Ace II (2008–present)
ATV
ET 250/300

See also 
 DL Motors

References

External links 
 Official English website
 Official Korean website
 Daelim Motor Australian Homepage
 Daelim Motor English Homepage
 Model lineup
 DAELIM models & history

Motorcycle manufacturers of South Korea
Scooter manufacturers
Vehicle manufacturing companies established in 1962
South Korean companies established in 1962
South Korean brands